Hugh Sinclair Swann (11 March 1925 – 13 June 2007), otherwise known as Tim Swann, became the cabinet maker to Elizabeth II of the United Kingdom. His work was inspired by his admiration for Barnsley, Gimson and Russell. He fitted many of the most important of Britain's coin collections including the Fitz-william, Cambridge, the Barber Institute, Birmingham, and the Hunterian Museum, Glasgow. More importantly yet, he supplied the Royal Mint with nearly 80 cabinets to house its complete collection.

His work for Elizabeth II began in 1975 when a complete reorganisation of the Royal coin collection at Windsor Castle was begun. The cabinets were created from specially purchased Honduras mahogany and Indian rosewood. On one occasion a log was delivered to his workshop addressed "Her Majesty the Queen of England, 3 Hexham Road, Heddon-on-the-Wall". 

He made the crosier and pectoral cross for Bishop Leonard

Family
Brother-in-law to Monsignor Graham Leonard former Bishop of London

Brother to Michael Swann, Baron Swann former chairman of the BBC

Nephew to Brigadier Vivian Dykes Chief Combined Secretary British Joint Staff Mission Washington 1942

Stepson to Sir Sydney Castle Roberts Secretary of Cambridge University Press, author and Vice-Chancellor of the University of Cambridge

References

1925 births
2007 deaths
British cabinetmakers